Empire Hotel or The Empire Hotel may refer to:

Empire Hotel, Fortitude Valley, Brisbane, Queensland, Australia
Empire Hotel, Queenstown, Tasmania, Australia
Empire Landmark Hotel, Vancouver, Canada
Empire Subang, Subang Jaya, Selangor, Malaysia
Empire Hotel, Dunedin, New Zealand
Empire Hotel, Kandy, Sri Lanka
Empire Hotel, Bath, England
The Empire Hotel (New York City), U.S.

See also
McAllister Tower Apartments, San Francisco, building formerly housing Empire Hotel